José Luis Cortez (born November 21, 1979, in Guayaquil) is an Ecuadorian footballer currently playing for Club Deportivo Quevedo.

Club career
Pépe's first started out at Espoli. In 2005, he was loaned to Aucas, but returned to Espoli the following season. Cortez also played for Deportivo Azogues before transferring to Barcelona Sporting Club for the 2007 campaign.

After spending one year in Barcelona SC, he became the new official player of Deportivo Quito.

In Deportivo Quito, Pépe had a great season. So far he has 34 appearances scoring two goals for the club. He played in the Copa Sudamericana 2008 where his team eventually fell to San Luis F.C. He is guaranteed a starting position and plays in the center midfield. Cortez is a key player to Dep. Quito and he is often called to the national team.

In December 2008, Dep. Quito won the Copa Pilsener 2008 with Pépe's help.

International career
He made his debut on the national team against Chile in the final game of the FIFA 2006 World Cup qualifier. He was called up to play against Iran and Oman in a friendly tournament.

References

External links

1979 births
Living people
Sportspeople from Guayaquil
Ecuadorian footballers
Ecuador international footballers
Association football defenders
C.D. ESPOLI footballers
S.D. Aucas footballers
Deportivo Azogues footballers
Barcelona S.C. footballers
S.D. Quito footballers
C.D. Universidad Católica del Ecuador footballers
C.S.D. Independiente del Valle footballers
C.S.D. Macará footballers
C.D. Quevedo footballers